James O'Brien (1945 – 19 August 2020) was an Irish hurler. At club level he played as a centre-back for Bruree and was the left corner-back on the Limerick senior hurling team that won the 1973 All-Ireland Championship.

O'Brien's skill was recognised at an early age when he won a South Limerick school's medal with Bruree National School, before an unrewarding spell at Rathluirc CBS. His career at club level with Bruree spanned three decades.

O'Brien won a Munster Championship medal with the Limerick minor hurling team in 1963, before being subsequently selected for the Limerick under-21 and junior teams. He made his first appearance for the Limerick senior hurling team during the 1966-67 National League and enjoyed his greatest successes as a defender over the following decade. In 1973 O'Brien became the first Bruree clubman to win an All-Ireland Championship medal, having earlier won Munster Championship and National Hurling League titles.

Honours

Limerick
All-Ireland Senior Hurling Championship (1): 1973
Munster Senior Hurling Championship (2): 1973, 1974
National Hurling League (1): 1970-71
Munster Minor Hurling Championship (1): 1963

Munster
Railway Cup (1): 1970

Awards
All-Star Award (1): 1973

References 

1945 births
Living people
Bruree hurlers
Limerick inter-county hurlers
Munster inter-provincial hurlers
All-Ireland Senior Hurling Championship winners